ARIA's End of Decade Top 100 Albums Chart are the best selling albums in Australia from 2000 to 2009. Delta Goodrem's debut record, Innocent Eyes, became the best-selling album in Australia in the 2000s, spending a total of 29 weeks at #1 and selling more than 1.2 million copies in Australia alone since it was released in 2003. Goodrem's second album, Mistaken Identity, managed to chart at 64. Other artists, such as Coldplay and U2, each provided four albums to ARIA's End of Decade Top 100 Album Chart, with Coldplay placing at number 19 with A Rush of Blood to the Head, X&Y at 38, Viva la Vida or Death and All His Friends at 52 and Parachutes at 99. U2 proved just as relevant to the 2000s as they were to the 1980s and 1990s, with All That You Can't Leave Behind at 41, How to Dismantle an Atomic Bomb at 71, The Best of 1990-2000 at 74 and U218 Singles at 92.

Six artists contributed three titles within the top 100, each having a significant impact on music charts and genres across the last decade; they were The Black Eyed Peas, Eminem, Kylie Minogue, Michael Bublé, Red Hot Chili Peppers and Robbie Williams. Minogue was notable for being the only female artist and only Australian artist to have three albums rank in the chart with Fever at 13, Light Years at 69 and Ultimate Kylie at 82.

Top 100

See also
List of best-selling singles of the 2000s in Australia

References

2000s
Australian record charts
2000s in Australian music